Tetrameridae is a family of spirurian nematodes. It is the smallest of the large genera making up the bulk of the superfamily Habronematoidea. Like all nematodes, they have neither a circulatory nor a respiratory system. They are parasites, chiefly of birds and cetaceans.

This family contains the largest known nematode: Placentonema gigantissima is several meters long and has been found in the placenta of the sperm whale (Physeter catodon).

Systematics
The Tetrameridae number about half a dozen genera only, but some are rather speciose; the type genus Tetrameres contains a lot of species even by nematode standards. While it might be overlumped, as presently delimited about half of the more than 100 species of Tetrameridae are placed in it.

Subfamily Crassicaudinae Yorke & Maplestone, 1926
 Crassicauda Leiper & Atkinson, 1914
 Placentonema Gubanov, 1951
Subfamily Geopetitiinae Chabaud, 1951
 Geopetitia Chabaud, 1951 [Diagnostic; French, Todd, Zachary & Meehan 1992
Subfamily Tetramerinae Travassos, 1914
 Microhadjelia Jogis, 1965
 Microtetrameres Travassos, 1915 
 Tetrameres Creplin, 1846

References 

Spirurida
Nematode families